The 1966 Appalachian State Mountaineers football team was an American football team that represented Appalachian State Teachers College (now known as Appalachian State University) as a member of the Carolinas Conference during the 1966 NAIA football season. In their second year under head coach Carl Messere, the Mountaineers compiled an overall record of 3–6–1, with a mark of 2–5 in conference play, and finished seventh in the Carolinas Conference.

Schedule

References

Appalachian State
Appalachian State Mountaineers football seasons
Appalachian State Mountaineers football